China Flat may refer to:

 China Flat (Santa Monica Mountains), a plateau in Ventura County, California
 Willow Creek, California, a census-designated place in Humboldt County, California